The 2007–08 Bobsleigh World Cup is a multi race tournament over a season for bobsleigh. The season started on 26 November 2007 and ended on 10 February 2008. The World Cup is organised by the FIBT who also run world cups and championships in skeleton.

Calendar

Standings

Two-man

Four-man

Two-woman

References

Bobsleigh World Cup
World Cup
World Cup